Heydar Aliyev's cult of personality, also known as Heydarism, became a significant part of Azerbaijani politics and society after he came to power in 1993 and continuing after his death in 2003, when his son Ilham Aliyev succeeded him. Aliyev, a former Soviet politburo member and the leader of Soviet Azerbaijan from 1969 to 1987, became the President of Azerbaijan in 1993. He then began to carefully design an autocratic system, with heavy reliance on family and clan members, oil revenues and patronage.

In Azerbaijan, Heydar Aliyev is presented as the "national leader of the Azeri nation".

Heydar Aliyev's image in Azerbaijan
Aliyev has long been accused of violating human rights and forming an autocratic system in Azerbaijan, with many critics even characterizing the regime as totalitarian. His personality cult has been compared to those in the Soviet Union, characterized by an atmosphere of fear in Azerbaijan and censorship of the press. This continued following his death. According to Azeri analyst Zafar Guliyev, the 2003 appointment of Ilham Aliyev as his father's successor instigated a process of asserting the personality cult of his predecessor and rewriting recent Azerbaijani history.

In his 2003 book The New Great Game: Blood and Oil in Central Asia, German journalist Lutz Kleveman described the situation:

Opposition analyst Zardusht Alizade has said that Aliyev "was the last representative of the political heritage of Stalin and Beria. [He] personified the most terrible experiences in the fate of the Azerbaijani people." The 2006 US Congressional Record Proceedings and Debates also expressed concern about how Ilham Aliyev's government maintains a "distinct Soviet-era state television network and has elevated Heydar Aliyev to the status of a minor personality cult figure."

American journalist and specialist on the Caucasus, Thomas Goltz wrote in 1998:

Julie Hill described the cult in her 2005 book, The Silk Road revisited: markets, merchants and minarets, as follows:

Heydar Aliyev's reaction
In 2001, when journalists from CIS countries asked Heydar Aliyev about his cult of personality, he responded:

Places named after Heydar Aliyev

Every city and town in Azerbaijan has a street named after Heydar Aliyev, including one of the central avenues of the capital Baku. According to official information, there are 60 Heydar Aliyev museums and centers in Azerbaijan.

Other places named after him include:
Baku International Airport, named after Heydar Aliyev on 10 March 2004.
Heydar Aliyev Sports and Exhibition Complex, Baku
Ministry of National Security Academy in Baku (ru)
Heydar Aliyev Cultural Center
Heydar Mosque in Baku (opened in 2014)
Baku Oil Refinery (ru)
The Baku factory of Deepwater Bases
Heydar Aliyev Georgia-Azerbaijan Humanitarian University, an independent university in Marneuli, Georgia (opened in 2008)

Outside of Azerbaijan

2004 – forest in Ankara, Turkey
2004 – street in Astana, Kazakhstan
2006 – park in Istanbul, Turkey
2007 – square in Tbilisi, Georgia
2007 – park in Ankara, Turkey
2007 – park in Bucharest, Romania
2007 – avenue in Amman, Jordan
2008 – street in Ankara, Turkey
2010 – forest in Foça, Turkey
2010 – avenue in Hadera, Israel
2010 – square in Kyiv, Ukraine
2010 – park in Kartepe, Turkey
2011 – bridge in Tarsus, Turkey
2011 – school in Ankara, Turkey
2011 – lycée in Iğdır, Turkey
2011 – street in Malgobek, Ingushetia, Russia
2011 – school in Astrakhan, Russia
Park in İzmir, Turkey
Avenue in İzmir, Turkey
Boulevard in İzmir, Turkey
High school in Aliağa, Turkey

On 14 June 2005, a commemorative plaque was opened in Saint Petersburg, Russia on 6 Gorokhovaya Street, near the house where Aliyev lived from 1949 to 1950.

Other
The Heydar Aliyev Order, founded in 2004, is the supreme order of the Azerbaijan Republic.

Gül bayramı
Annually, since 2000, a festival is held in Baku in honor of Heydar Aliyev, called Gül bayramı, which translates to "Flower Feast". It starts on 10 May and lasts a few days. Traditionally, it is held in Heydar Aliyev Park, in front of the Central Bank of Azerbaijan, where unique flowers from around the world are gathered. According to the opposition Yeni Musavat newspaper, over $76 million were spent in 2013 on this festival.<ref>{{cite news|title=Radio Liberty: Tens of millions of dollars, which could provide thousands of people with housing, are spent on Flower Festival|url=http://www.panorama.am/en/society/2013/05/10/az-holiday/|access-date=12 May 2013|date=10 May 2013|agency=Panorama.am}}</ref>

Films
Two films were shot in 2003 commemorating Aliyev's 80th birthday. Black Label (Qara nişanə) was directed by Vagif Mustafayev with Polish actor Tadeusz Huk (pl) playing Aliyev's role. The Moment of Truth'' was directed by Ramiz Fataliyev (ru) with Russian actor Aleksandr Baluyev (ru) playing the lead role.

Post stamps

Statues and monuments

In Azerbaijan
Almost every major Azerbaijani city has at least one monument of Heydar Aliyev. Following his death in 2003, many more were erected in Azerbaijan and in other countries, especially in post-Soviet states.

In the capital Baku, there are at least three Heydar Aliyev statues: at Heydar Aliyev International Airport, at the Alley of Honor and in Heydar Aliyev Park on Rashid Behbudov Street.

Settlements in Azerbaijan with statues and monuments of Heydar Aliyev include:

Ağcabədi
Ağdaş
Agsu
Astara
Biləsuvar
Cəlilabad
Daşkəsən
Ganja
Goranboy
Horadiz
İmişli
İvanovka
Lankaran
Lerik
Masallı
Naftalan
Nəbiağalı
Nakhichevan City
Oğuz
Qabala
Qazax
Qax
Qıvraq
Qobustan
Quba
Qusar
Quzanlı
Saatlı
Sabirabad
Salyan
Şabran
Şamaxı
Şəki
Şəmkir
Shirvan
Siyəzən
Sumqayit
Tovuz
Ucar
Xaçmaz
Xızı
Xırdalan
Yardımlı

Outside of Azerbaijan

Since Aliyev's death in 2003, many statues have been erected outside of Azerbaijan as well.

The first statue of Aliyev outside Azerbaijan was inaugurated in Kyiv (2004). That same year, a bust of Aliyev was inaugurated in Bucharest, in a park named after him in 2007. Later statues were erected in Comrat, Gagauzia, Moldova (2007), Tbilisi (2007) Qalyub, a suburb of Cairo (2008) Belgrade's Tašmajdan Park (2011) and Mexico City (2012). However, the latter was removed in 2013 following significant controversy.

In only two years, three statues of Aliyev were erected in Russia: in Ulyanovsk (2009), Dzhemikent village, Derbentsky District, Dagestan (2010) and Astrakhan (2010).

Statues of Aliyev were also installed in four Turkish cities: Kars (2007), Ankara, Istanbul's Haydar Aliyev Park, and İzmir (2018). A bust of Aliyev was inaugurated in Tashkent, Uzbekistan in 2018.

See also
Heydar Aliyev
Ilham Aliyev
Cult of personality

References

Politics of Azerbaijan
Aliyev, Heydar
Cult of personality